David McCallum is a Scottish actor and musician.

David McCallum may also refer to:

David McCallum Sr., musician, father of David McCallum
David McCallum (wrongful conviction)